Whitlocks Crossing is a ghost town in Potter County, in the U.S. state of South Dakota.

History
a post office called Whitlocks Crossing was established in 1935, and remained in operation until 1954. The town was named for the original owner of the town site.

References

Ghost towns in South Dakota
Geography of Potter County, South Dakota